Sir Norman Leslie Browse   (1 December 1931 – 12 September 2019) was a British surgeon and President of the States of Alderney from 2002 to 2011.

Professional life

Between 1965 and 1996, Sir Norman was Professor of Surgery and a Consultant Surgeon at St. Thomas's Hospital, London. From 1992 until 1995 he was President of the Royal College of Surgeons of England. Browse served as Chair of the British Atherosclerosis Discussion Group in the late 1980s, this group was the forerunner to the British Atherosclerosis Society.

Browse received a knighthood in the 1994 Birthday Honours having the honour bestowed on 20 July 1994

President

Sir Norman was elected for the first time in 2002. He was re-elected in 2004 for a further four-year term. In his capacity as President, he was chair of all meetings of the States of Alderney.

Notes and references

External links
States of Alderney Website

1931 births
2019 deaths
People from Alderney
Politics of Alderney
Fellows of King's College London
Knights Bachelor